The 1950–51 NCAA men's ice hockey season began in November 1950 and concluded with the 1951 NCAA Men's Ice Hockey Tournament's championship game on March 17, 1951 at the Broadmoor Ice Palace in Colorado Springs, Colorado. This was the 4th season in which an NCAA ice hockey championship was held and is the 57th year overall where an NCAA school fielded a team.

This was the first season of play for the Tri-State League. The 6-team conference was the first to formally sponsor ice hockey as a sport at any level. The Tri-State League also produced the first conference playoff game this season when Clarkson defeated Middlebury to claim the conference title. There would not be another conference playoff until the WCHA tournament began in 1960.

The American Hockey Coaches Association awarded Eddie Jeremiah the first Spencer Penrose Award as the top coach in the college game. It is named after Spencer Penrose who helped found The Broadmoor, the hotel and resort where the Ice Palace was located.

Regular season

Season tournaments

Standings

1951 NCAA Tournament

Player stats

Scoring leaders
The following players led the league in points at the conclusion of the season.

GP = Games played; G = Goals; A = Assists; Pts = Points; PIM = Penalty minutes

Leading goaltenders
The following goaltenders led the league in goals against average at the end of the regular season while playing at least 33% of their team's total minutes.

GP = Games played; Min = Minutes played; W = Wins; L = Losses; OT = Overtime/shootout losses; GA = Goals against; SO = Shutouts; SV% = Save percentage; GAA = Goals against average

Awards

NCAA

References

External links
College Hockey Historical Archives
1950–51 NCAA Standings

 
NCAA